MILF is a 2010 sex comedy film by The Asylum. The film borrows elements from American Pie and Revenge of the Nerds.

Synopsis 
After failing romantically with girls their own age, a group of nerdy male college students discover the excitement of hooking up with sexy older women, often referred to as MILFs (mother I'd like to fuck). Lifelong best friends Brandon and Anthony as well as their geek/gamer friends Nate and Ross succeed beyond their wildest dreams as they hook up with lady after lady. However, when Brandon falls for Anthony's sexually active mother, the guys' whole scheme begins to fall apart.

Cast
Jack Cullison as Brandon Murphy
Phillip Marlatt as Anthony Reese
Joseph Booton as Nate Hooligans
Ramon Camacho as Ross Makhsilumm
Amy Lindsay as Holly Reese
Molinee Green as Lori Murphy
Silvija Durann as Mindy
Melidia Camren as Renna
Rachel Riley as Erica
Jamie Bernadette as Alex
Diana Terranova as Rhonda

Reception
The film received mostly negative reviews. PopMatters ran a mostly supportive review, giving the film six of ten stars. Critic Bill Gibron commented, "MILF may not be the most endemic example of this company's product, but it's still a glorious, goofy guilty pleasure." He also wrote, "It may not be laugh out loud funny, but is constantly keeps you smiling."

References

External links 
 MILF at The Asylum
 
 

2010 direct-to-video films
American direct-to-video films
2010s buddy comedy films
2010 independent films
2010s sex comedy films
2010s teen comedy films
American buddy comedy films
American sex comedy films
American teen comedy films
Casual sex in films
2010s English-language films
Films directed by Scott Wheeler
Films set in universities and colleges
Teen buddy films
The Asylum films
2010 comedy films
2010s American films